The Gdańsk Agreement (or Gdańsk Social Accord(s) or August Agreement(s)) was an accord reached as a direct result of the strikes that took place in Gdańsk, Poland. Workers along the Baltic went on strike in August 1980 in support of the 21 demands of MKS which eventually led to the creation of Solidarity.

Background

The labor strikes did not occur because of problems that emerged shortly before the unrest, but due to political and economic difficulties the previous ten years. Under the rule of Władysław Gomułka in the late 1960s, Poland's economy was in disarray. To counter this, the government increased food prices just before Christmas 1970 which irritated the entire populace of the nation.

On December 14, 1970, workers from the Lenin shipyard in Gdańsk began a strike against party headquarters within the city insisting on the formation of independent trade unions. In this disturbance 75 people were killed after Gomułka ordered that the revolt be put down with force. As R. J. Crampton wrote: "The Kremlin did not agree and intervened to urge the need for a political solution. For the nationalist communist Gomułka, Soviet dictation of internal Polish policies was too much." 

Edward Gierek, who appeared to be more open to workers' needs and have strong political ties to the working class, soon replaced Gomułka. This was the first occasion in Europe since World War II that labor strikes were able to remove a ruler from power.

Gierek was able to stress economic reforms during the first half of his tenure of office. According to R. J. Crampton: "The stated objective of the reforms was to increase living standards; a less publicly attested motivation was the knowledge that, with prices fixed and with demand increasing, goods had to be put into circulation to avoid rampant inflation." 

In the years prior to the Gdańsk strikes in 1980 the reforms of Gierek did succeed as planned, but the economy of Poland became progressively more unstable. This was due to Poland's reliance on western markets and loans that the nation could not repay.

Fueled by large infusions of Western credit, Poland's economic growth rate was one of the world's highest during the first half of the 1970s, but much of the borrowed capital was misspent and the centrally planned economy was unable to use the new resources effectively. The growing debt burden became insupportable in the late 1970s and economic growth had become negative by 1979.

Strikes of 1980
As the economic crisis became unbearable, the Communist government authorized an increase in food prices for the summer of 1980. Once again a revival of labor disturbances erupted throughout the nation. Workers of the Lenin Shipyard in Gdańsk ultimately went on strike in mid-August, sparked by the firing of Anna Walentynowicz. 

Led by electrician Lech Wałęsa, the workers seized arsenals, took control of the shipyard and demanded labor reform and greater civil rights including the rights of freedom of expression, freedom of speech, freedom of assembly and freedom of religion, as well as the release of political prisoners. On the third day of the strike, on August 16, 1980, management granted Lenin Shipyard workers their working and pay demands. Wałęsa and others announced the end of the strike, however the women of the shipyard, Anna Walentynowicz and Alina Pienkowska transformed a strike over bread and butter issues into a solidarity strike in sympathy with other striking establishments.

Agreement
Due to the popular support of the citizens and other striking groups, the Gdańsk workers held out until the government gave in to their demands. The successful strikers formed the Gdańsk Agreement on August 31, 1980 as an authentic social contract with the government. This allowed citizens to bring democratic changes within the communist political structure. The main concern of the workers was the establishment of a trade union independent of communist party control and the legal right to strike. In creating these new groups, there would be a clear representation of the workers' needs.

"These new unions are intended to defend the social and material interests of the workers, and not to play the role of a political party, they will be established on the basis of socialization of the means of production and of the socialist system that exists in Poland today." Other major concerns were to control commercial prices, the use of foreign money in all internal economic dealings, ensuring the proper supply of resources within the nation and only exporting the excess. This would ensure that there would be a better chance for prosperity within the nation for all working citizens.

List of Points
1. Acceptance of free trade unions independent of the Communist Party and of enterprises, in accordance with convention No. 87 of the International Labor Organization concerning the right to form free trade unions, which was ratified by the Communist Government of Poland.

2. A guarantee of the right to strike and of the security of strikers and those aiding them.

3. Compliance with the constitutional guarantee of freedom of speech, the press and publication, including freedom for independent publishers, and the availability of the mass media to representatives of all faiths.

4. A return of former rights to: 1) People dismissed from work after the 1970 and 1976 strikes, and 2) Students expelled from school because of their views. The release of all political prisoners, among them Edward Zadrozynski, Jan Kozlowski, and Marek Kozlowski. A halt in repression of the individual because of personal conviction.

5. Availability to the mass media of information about the formation of the Inter-factory Strike Committee and publication of its demands.

6. The undertaking of actions aimed at bringing the country out of its crisis situation by the following means: a) making public complete information about the social-economic situation, and b) enabling all sectors and social classes to take part in discussion of the reform programme.

7. Compensation of all workers taking part in the strike for the period of the strike, with vacation pay from the Central Council of Trade Unions.

8. An increase in the base pay of each worker by 2,000 złoty a month as compensation for the recent raise in prices.

9. Guaranteed automatic increases in pay on the basis of increases in prices and the decline in real income.

10. A full supply of food products for the domestic market, with exports limited to surpluses.

11. The abolition of 'commercial' prices and of other sales for hard currency in special shops.

12. The selection of management personnel on the basis of qualifications, not party membership. Privileges of the secret police, regular police and party apparatus are to be eliminated by equalizing family subsidies, abolishing special stores, etc.

13. The introduction of food coupons for meat and meat products (during the period in which control of the market situation is regained).

14. Reduction in the age for retirement for women to 50 and for men to 55, or after 30 years' employment in Poland for women and 35 years for men, regardless of age.

15. Conformity of old-age pensions and annuities with what has actually been paid in.

16. Improvements in the working conditions of the health service to insure full medical care for workers.

17. Assurances of a reasonable number of places in day-care centers and kindergartens for the children of working mothers.

18. Paid maternity leave for three years.

19. A decrease in the waiting period for apartments.

20. An increase in the commuter's allowance to 100 złoty from 40, with a supplemental benefit on separation.

21. A day of rest on Saturday. Workers in the brigade system or round-the-clock jobs are to be compensated for the loss of free Saturdays with an increased leave or other paid time off.

Impact

The Gdańsk Agreement is very important to the politics of Poland because the strikes exposed the corruption and negligence within the state's leadership. In recognizing individual rights, such as the freedom of expression, the government is opened for the creation of civil societies. This allows citizens to come together where all people can agree on human rights regardless of party beliefs. The problems caused by the labor movements and the ensuing Gdańsk Agreement led to the removal of Edward Gierek and the installation of Stanisław Kania in September 1980.

Solidarność (Solidarity), the independent trade union that emerged from the Lenin Shipyard strike, was unlike anything in the history of Poland. Even though it was mainly a labor movement representing workers led by chairman Wałęsa, it attracted an assorted membership of different citizens which quickly rose to unpararelled proportion of a quarter of the country's population: 10 million people nationwide. Due to its enormous size and newly found power, the union assumed the role of a national reform lobby able to change politics in Poland forever.

On the second anniversary of the agreement, August 31, 1982, a massive wave of anti-government demonstrations took place across Poland. The regime answered with police force; according to Solidarity, at least seven people were killed throughout Poland.

References

Further reading
 Stokes, Gale. From Stalinism to Pluralism. New York: Oxford University Press, 1996
 Szporer, Michael Solidarity: The Great Workers Strike of 1980. Lexington Books, 2012

1980 in Poland
History of Gdańsk
Solidarity (Polish trade union)
August 1980 events in Europe
1980 documents
Events in Gdańsk